The Cooey Model 60 is a bolt action repeating rifle that appeared in 1939–1940, capable of firing .22 short, .22 long and .22 LR (long rifle) rimfire cartridges. The Model 60 had a tubular magazine, capable of holding 10 to 15 rounds depending on the type of cartridges.  It was manufactured by H. W. Cooey Machine & Arms Company in Cobourg, Ontario, Canada, until 1979; and was also known as the Ranger.

It was replaced by the Model 600 in 1967 during the Winchester era. Some Model 600 Cooey rifles were produced with a rabbit engraved into the stock, this is sometimes referred to as the "Jackrabbit Special".

Another Cooey rifle that was similar to the Model 60, the Model 75, was essentially a single-shot version of the Model 60.  Both rifles had 24" barrels and could fire the same ammunition.  The Model 39, another single shot version, had a 22" barrel and weighed only 4.5 lbs.

See also 
 Cooey Canuck

External links 
 Cooey model 60 at Gunsopedia.

Bolt-action rifles of Canada
.22 LR rifles